Three Oh's, 1966 brown Quarter Horse stallion, AQHA #0458120, winner of the 1968 All American Futurity. He sired Maskeo Lad, a 1972 brown Quarter Horse stallion, AQHA #0835539, who was the 1975 AQHA Racing Champion Three-Year-Old Colt, and Oh Shiney, a 1976 black Quarter Horse stallion, AQHA #1431631, who was the 1981 AQHA Racing Champion Aged Stallion.  Three Oh's sired seven crops before his death in 1976 at age 10.  All totaled, he sired earners of over $4.7 million including 57 stakes winners.  He set track records in 1968–1969 at several tracks in the Southwest, and was inducted into the Texas Horse Racing Hall of Fame. He was owned by Dr. & Mrs. D. G. Strole of Abilene, Texas and trained by C.W. "Bubba" Cascio.

Pedigree

References

American Quarter Horse racehorses
American Quarter Horse sires